Neoware Systems, Inc., was a company that manufactured and marketed thin clients. It also developed and marketed enterprise software, thin client appliances, and related services aimed at reducing the TCO of IT infrastructure.

Neoware owned one of the three available "OS Streaming" technologies that make it possible to remote boot diskless computers under Microsoft Windows and Linux.

On July 23, 2007, HP announced that it has signed a definitive merger agreement to purchase Neoware for $241 million. The acquisition was completed on October 1, 2007.

Products
 Thin clients
 Neoware TeemTalk (Pericom was acquired July 2003)
 Neoware Image Manager (Qualystem Technology S.A.S. was acquired April 2005)
 LBT Linux-Based Terminal 
 ezRemote Manager
 Thintune Linux/Manager (the brand was acquired from eSeSIX in March 2005)
 Neoware Device Manager
 NeoLinux 4
 Windows XPe
 Windows CE

References

 PC Magazine Editors' Choice, March 2000
 Deloitte's Technology Fast 50 Program for the Delaware Valley
 Various press releases in Neoware's site "press releases" section 

1992 establishments in Pennsylvania
2007 disestablishments in Pennsylvania
American companies established in 1992
American companies disestablished in 2007
Companies based in Montgomery County, Pennsylvania
Computer companies established in 1992
Computer companies disestablished in 2007
Defunct computer companies of the United States
Hewlett-Packard acquisitions